Rosières-en-Haye is a commune in the Meurthe-et-Moselle department in north-eastern France.
It hosted an important Air Base (the Toul-Rosières Air Base) that has been converted in 2012 in the largest photovoltaic power plant of Europe at that time.

See also
 Toul-Rosières Solar Park
 Communes of the Meurthe-et-Moselle department
Parc naturel régional de Lorraine

References

Rosieresenhaye